Raúl Neyid Pineda Rodríguez (born 4 May 1996) is a Colombian male badminton player.

Achievements

BWF International Challenge/Series
Men's Singles

 BWF International Challenge tournament
 BWF International Series tournament
 BWF Future Series tournament

References

External links
 

Living people
1996 births
Colombian male badminton players
21st-century Colombian people